Lipin-1 is a protein that in humans is encoded by the LPIN1 gene.

Function 

Lipin-1 has phosphatidate phosphatase activity. The nuclear localization of Lipin 1 is regulated by the mammalian Target Of Rapamycin protein kinase and links mTORC1 activity to the regulation of Sterol regulatory element-binding proteins (SREBP)-dependent gene transcription.

Clinical significance 

Homozygous mutations in LPIN1 gene in humans cause recurrent rhabdomyolysis and exercise-induced myalgia while carrier state may predispose for statin-induced myopathy.

This gene also represents a candidate gene for human lipodystrophy, characterized by loss of body fat, fatty liver, hypertriglyceridemia, and insulin resistance. Mouse studies suggest that this gene functions during normal adipose tissue development and may also play a role in human triglyceride metabolism.

References

Further reading